Alexander Alexandrovich Smolyar (born 19 July 2001) is a Russian racing driver who most recently competed in the FIA Formula 3 Championship for MP Motorsport.

Racing career

Lower formulae
2017 was Smolyar's debut season in single-seater racing. He competed for SMP Racing in the Spanish and Russian Formula 4 Championships, finishing 3rd in both. He scored a total of 24 podiums, with all of his race wins coming in the Spanish Championship.

Formula Renault Eurocup

2018 
In the following two years the Russian driver raced in the Formula Renault Eurocup. In his debut campaign, driving for Tech 1 Racing, Smolyar finished 12th in the standings, beating out two of his three teammates and helping the team to finish 5th in the team championship.

2019 
His 2019 season would prove to be much more successful. He finished 3rd and won three races, only being beaten in the championship by Frenchman Victor Martins and his R-ace GP teammate, Oscar Piastri.

FIA Formula 3 Championship

2020 
Smolyar was signed by ART Grand Prix to drive for them in the 2020 Formula 3 Championship alongside ADAC F4 champion Théo Pourchaire and Sebastián Fernández. Despite a slew of strong performances, which included a pole position at the Hungaroring and a win on the road at the first round in Britain the Russian's season was plagued with bad luck. This included having his win taken away by a penalty for weaving on the Hangar straight as well as a collision at the first corner in Budapest. Smolyar scored his only podium of the season in the second race at Monza and ended up eleventh in the standings, behind eventual runner-up Pourchaire, but ahead of his more experienced teammate Fernández.

2021 

For the 2021 season Smolyar re-signed with ART, this time partnering Frederik Vesti and racing returnee Juan Manuel Correa. Smolyar's start to the season was strong, with him taking his first Formula 3 victory in the first race of the opening weekend. He then continued his good form and came out victorious in race one at the Circuit Paul Ricard, after having battled from sixth on the grid to first on the final lap. Smolyar finished the season with a total of 106 points, placing 6th in the championship. During that season, he scored a total of 2 wins, 2 fastest laps, and 4 podiums.

2022 

On 20 January 2022, Smolyar announced that he would switch to MP Motorsport for the 2022 season. However, he was banned of using the Russian flag due to 2022 Russian invasion of Ukraine. He was initially not due to race in the championship due to the mentioned war, but eventually was allowed to race. Smolyar was forced to miss the Silverstone round of the championship since he could not get to the United Kingdom due to visa issues, and was replaced by Filip Ugran. He returned to his seat for the remaining events and picked up his sole win of the season in the feature race in Budapest. Smolyar ended up tenth in the standings, being the highest placed driver to have missed a round.

Karting record

Karting career summary

Complete Karting World Championship results

Racing record

Racing career summary

Complete SMP F4 Championship results 
(key) (Races in bold indicate pole position) (Races in italics indicate fastest lap)

Complete F4 Spanish Championship results 
(key) (Races in bold indicate pole position) (Races in italics indicate fastest lap)

Complete Formula Renault Eurocup results
(key) (Races in bold indicate pole position) (Races in italics indicate fastest lap)

Complete FIA Formula 3 Championship results
(key) (Races in bold indicate pole position; races in italics indicate points for the fastest lap of top ten finishers)

References

External links
 

2001 births
Living people
People from Yuzhno-Sakhalinsk
Russian racing drivers
Spanish F4 Championship drivers
SMP F4 Championship drivers
FIA Formula 3 Championship drivers
Formula Renault Eurocup drivers
SMP Racing drivers
Tech 1 Racing drivers
R-ace GP drivers
ART Grand Prix drivers
MP Motorsport drivers
Formula Renault 2.0 NEC drivers
Karting World Championship drivers